Supply is an unincorporated area in Essex County, Virginia.

History
A post office called Supply was established in 1898. The origin of the name "Supply" is obscure.

References

Unincorporated communities in Essex County, Virginia
Unincorporated communities in Virginia